Mes couleurs is the second studio album by French pop-R&B singer-songwriter Leslie Bourgoin, released on May 11, 2004. Bourgoin co-wrote all fifteen tracks on the album. Mes couleurs debuted at number ten on the French Albums Chart. On October 13, 2005, exactly one year and five months after its release, the album was certified double gold by the SNEP. It remains Bourgoin's best-selling album to date, with sales over 250,000 copies in France, as of September 2010.

Track listing
"Intro"
"Vivons Pour Demain"
"Sobri (notre destin)" [featuring Amine]
"Et J'attends"
"Nos Colères"
"Où Tu Veux Aller" [featuring Orishas]
"Le Temps Qui Passe"
"Égoïstes"
"Tous Ces Gens"
"Laissez-Les Respirer"
"Sans Toi"
"Dice-Dice"
"J'Accuse" [featuring Kery James]
"Cher Toi"
"Évolution"

Charts and certifications

Weekly charts

Certifications

References

2005 albums
Leslie (singer) albums